John Richard Bauer (March 11, 1932 – December 26, 2010) was an American football guard and tackle who played for the National Football League's (NFL) New York Giants.

Born in Benton, Illinois, Bauer attended the University of Illinois, where he played for the school's football team from 1951 to 1953. In the first round of the 1954 NFL Draft, the Cleveland Browns chose him with the 12th overall pick. In August 1954, Bauer was traded to the Green Bay Packers as part of a six-player transaction. A month later, the Giants acquired Bauer from the Packers in another trade. Bauer played in two games for the Giants during the 1954 NFL season as a backup. He went into the Army and returned to the Giants in 1957, but left the team before the start of the season.

References

External links
NFL.com profile

1932 births
2010 deaths
American football offensive guards
American football offensive tackles
Illinois Fighting Illini football players
New York Giants players
People from Benton, Illinois
Players of American football from Illinois